The California chipmunk or chaparral chipmunk (Neotamias obscurus) is a species of rodent in the squirrel family Sciuridae. It is found in Baja California, Mexico and in southern California in the United States.

References

Neotamias
Mammals described in 1890
Taxonomy articles created by Polbot